Manuel Pfister (born 4 December 1988) is an Austrian luger who has competed since 1999. His best finish at the FIL World Luge Championships was 17th in the men's singles event at Oberhof in 2008.

Pfister's best finish at the FIL European Luge Championships was seventh in the men's singles event at Sigulda in 2010.

He qualified for the 2010 Winter Olympics, finishing tenth.

He was talked about in an episode of the BBC Three topical comedy programme Russell Howard's Good News.

References
 FIL-Luge profile

External links
 
 
 

1988 births
Living people
Austrian male lugers
Olympic lugers of Austria
Lugers at the 2010 Winter Olympics